This is a list of minister from Uma Bharti cabinets starting from December 2003. Uma Bharti is the leader of Bharatiya Janata Party was sworn in the Chief Ministers of Madhya Pradesh in December 2003. Here is the list of the ministers of her ministry.

Cabinet Ministers 

 Uma Bharti - Chief Minister
 Babulal Gaur
 Gauri Shankar Shejwar
 Kailash Chawla
 Raghavji
 Dhal Singh Bisen
 Gopal Bhargava
 Kailash Vijayvargiya
 Choudhury Chandrabhan Singh
 Narendra Singh Tomar
 Harnam Singh Rathore
 Ramakant Tiwari
 Om Prakash Dhurve

Minister of State 

 Anoop Mishra
 Meena Singh
 Jagdish Mubel
 Badrilal Yadav
 Alka Jain

See also 

 Government of Madhya Pradesh
 Madhya Pradesh Legislative Assembly

References

Bharatiya Janata Party state ministries
2003 in Indian politics
Bharti
2003 establishments in Madhya Pradesh
2004 disestablishments in India
Cabinets established in 2003
Cabinets established in 2004